Kambal, Karibal (International title: Heart & Soul / ) is a 2017 Philippine television drama series starting Bianca Umali and Miguel Tanfelix. The series premiered on GMA Network's GMA Telebabad evening block and worldwide on GMA Pinoy TV on November 27, 2017 to August 3, 2018, replacing the second season of Alyas Robin Hood.

NUTAM (Nationwide Urban Television Audience Measurement) People in Television Homes ratings are provided by AGB Nielsen Philippines. The series ended, but its the 35th-week run, and with a total of 178 episodes. It was replaced by Onanay.

Series overview 
Kambal, Karibal is divided into two seasons. The first season features the original story, and ends with a teaser revealing that it was Raymond who had ended up on the island, and Allan and Geraldine find their twins. The second season included the new characters of Selya, Darren and Valerie. As a result, the following week though shows otherwise. Now, since this extension was only until May, we actually see a conclusion or semi-closure towards the characters. The series was then extended for the 3rd time, adding the twist of Cheska's return and the addition of Cheska's real mother, Maricar. This is where the second season starts. According to GMA, if the series wasn't extended for the 3rd time (when season 2 starts), the ending of the series would have been a body swap between Crisan and Crisel, living happily together, starting over a new life But due to the series' extension, a new twist was added.

<onlyinclude>

Season 1 (2017-2018)

November 2017

December 2017

January 2018

February 2018

March 2018

April 2018

May 2018

Season 2 (2018)

May 2018

June 2018

July 2018

August 2018

References

Lists of Philippine drama television series episodes